The AIX Toolbox for Linux Applications is a collection of GNU tools for IBM AIX. These tools are available for installation using Red Hat's RPM format.

Licensing 

Each of these packages includes its own licensing information and while IBM has made the code available to AIX users, the code is provided as is and has not been thoroughly tested. The Toolbox is meant to provide a core set of some of the most common development tools and libraries along with the more popular GNU packages.

References

External links 

 AIX Toolbox for Open Source Software - Overview

Programming tools
Free compilers and interpreters
Free software programmed in C
Free software programmed in C++
System administration
Red Hat
UNIX System V
IBM operating systems
Power ISA operating systems
PowerPC operating systems